Babel is a surname. Notable people with the surname include:

Günther Babel, German politician
Isaac Babel, Soviet journalist, playwright, and short story writer
Johann Baptist Babel, Swiss sculptor
Louis Babel, Oblate priest
Meike Babel, German tennis champion
Pierre-Edmé Babel (1720–1775), French engraver
Ryan Babel, Dutch footballer

See also 

 Babel (disambiguation)

Surnames
English-language surnames
German-language surnames
Surnames of English origin
Surnames of German origin
Surnames of British Isles origin